Stert is a village in Wiltshire, England.

Stert may also refer to
Stert, a village in Somerset, England, now generally called Steart
Stert Island, in the Bristol Channel, England
Johannes Stert (b,1963), German composer

See also 
 Sterte